is an upcoming sports role-playing video game developed and published by Level-5, planned for release for PlayStation 4, Nintendo Switch, Android, and iOS in 2023. 

A part of the Inazuma Eleven series, it was announced as Inazuma Eleven Ares in 2016 and was set to be released in 2018 before being delayed to 2023. The game went through several names during development, including Inazuma Eleven: Great Road of Heroes and Inazuma Eleven: Victory Road of Heroes.

An anime originally meant to tie into the game, Inazuma Eleven: Ares, aired in Japan in 2018.

References

External links 

Upcoming video games scheduled for 2023
Android (operating system) games
Association football video games
Inazuma Eleven video games
IOS games
Japanese role-playing games
Nintendo Switch games
PlayStation 4 games
Video games developed in Japan
Video games scored by Yasunori Mitsuda